Thymic veins are veins which drain the thymus.  They are tributaries of the left brachiocephalic vein.

External links
 
 
 http://www.instantanatomy.net/thorax/vessels/vinsuperiormediastinum.html
 https://radiopaedia.org/cases/thymic-vein-on-ct

Veins of the head and neck